Stutsman County is a county in the U.S. state of North Dakota. As of the 2020 census, the population was 21,593. Its county seat is Jamestown.

The Jamestown, North Dakota Micropolitan Statistical Area includes all of Stutsman County.

History
The Dakota Territory legislature created the county on January 4, 1873, with area partitioned from Buffalo and Pembina counties. It was not organized at that time, nor was it attached to another county for administrative or judicial purposes. It was named for Enos Stutsman, an area lawyer and politician. On June 10 of the same year, the county organization was effected, with Jamestown as the county seat. Its boundaries have not changed since its creation.

Geography
The James River flows south-southeasterly through the east central part of the county. The terrain consists of low rolling hills, dotted with lakes and ponds in its western portion. The area is largely devoted to agriculture. The terrain slopes to the east and south; its highest point is a hill at the southwestern corner, at 1,965' (599m) ASL. It is the second-largest county in North Dakota by land area and third-largest by total area.

Major highways

Adjacent counties

 Foster County - north
 Griggs County - northeast
 Barnes County - east
 LaMoure County - southeast
 Logan County - southwest
 Kidder County - west
 Wells County - northwest

Protected areas

 Arrowwood National Wildlife Refuge (part)
 Chase Lake National Wildlife Refuge
 Halfway Lake National Wildlife Refuge
 National Audubon Society Alkali Lake Wildlife Refuge

Lakes

 Alkali Lake
 Arrowwood Lake
 Barnes Lake
 Big Mallard Marsh
 Blair Slough
 Blue Lake
 Chase Lake
 Chicago Lake
 Colby Lake
 Eric Lake
 Fischer Lake
 Fisher Lake
 Jamestown Reservoir
 Jim Lake
 Moon Lake
 Mud Lake
 Northwest Lake
 Pearl Lake
 Runner Slough
 School Lake
 Spiritwood Lake
 Trautman Slough
 West Lake

Demographics

2000 census
As of the 2000 census, there were 21,908 people, 8,954 households, and 5,649 families in the county. The population density was 10 per square mile (4/km2). There were 9,817 housing units at an average density of 4 per square mile (2/km2). The racial makeup of the county was 97.53% White, 0.28% Black or African American, 0.94% Native American, 0.37% Asian, 0.04% Pacific Islander, 0.21% from other races, and 0.64% from two or more races. 0.93% of the population were Hispanic or Latino of any race. 52.3% were of German and 18.0% Norwegian ancestry.

There were 8,954 households, out of which 28.80% had children under the age of 18 living with them, 52.50% were married couples living together, 7.50% had a female householder with no husband present, and 36.90% were non-families. 32.70% of all households were made up of individuals, and 14.60% had someone living alone who was 65 years of age or older.  The average household size was 2.28 and the average family size was 2.89.

The county population contained 22.80% under the age of 18, 10.50% from 18 to 24, 25.70% from 25 to 44, 23.30% from 45 to 64, and 17.60% who were 65 years of age or older. The median age was 40 years. For every 100 females there were 96.50 males. For every 100 females age 18 and over, there were 93.20 males.

The median income for a household in the county was $33,848, and the median income for a family was $42,853. Males had a median income of $28,529 versus $20,397 for females. The per capita income for the county was $17,706. About 6.80% of families and 10.40% of the population were below the poverty line, including 13.00% of those under age 18 and 10.50% of those age 65 or over.

2010 census
As of the 2010 census, there were 21,100 people, 8,931 households, and 5,255 families in the county. The racial makeup of the county was 95.6% white, 1.4% American Indian, 0.7% black or African American, 0.5% Asian, 0.1% Pacific islander, 0.5% from other races, and 1.3% from two or more races. Those of Hispanic or Latino origin made up 1.7% of the population. In terms of ancestry, 56.5% were German, 27.6% were Norwegian, 7.2% were Irish, 6.0% were Russian, 5.2% were English, and 2.4% were American.

Of the 8,931 households, 25.6% had children under the age of 18 living with them, 47.3% were married couples living together, 7.5% had a female householder with no husband present, 41.2% were non-families, and 35.3% of all households were made up of individuals. The average household size was 2.17 and the average family size was 2.79. The median age was 42.0 years.

The median income for a household in the county was $44,620 and the median income for a family was $60,171. Males had a median income of $40,365 versus $27,549 for females. The per capita income for the county was $23,307. About 6.3% of families and 12.1% of the population were below the poverty line, including 14.5% of those under age 18 and 14.6% of those age 65 or over.

Communities

Cities

 Buchanan
 Cleveland
 Courtenay
 Jamestown (county seat)
 Kensal
 Medina
 Montpelier
 Pingree
 Spiritwood Lake
 Streeter
 Woodworth

Census-designated places
 Spiritwood
 Ypsilanti

Unincorporated communities

 Bloom
 Clementsville
 Durupt
 Fried
 Kloze
 Millarton
 Sharlow
 Sydney
 Vashti

Townships

 Alexander
 Ashland
 Bloom
 Bloomenfield
 Buchanan
 Chicago
 Conklin
 Corinne
 Corwin
 Courtenay
 Cusator
 Deer Lake
 Durham
 Edmunds
 Eldridge
 Flint
 Fried
 Gerber
 Germania
 Glacier
 Gray
 Griffin
 Hidden
 Homer
 Iosco
 Jim River Valley
 Kensal
 Lenton
 Lippert
 Lowery
 Lyon
 Manns
 Marstonmoor
 Midway
 Montpelier
 Moon Lake
 Newbury
 Nogosek
 Paris
 Peterson
 Pingree
 Pipestem Valley
 Plainview
 Rose
 Round Top
 St. Paul
 Severn
 Sharlow
 Sinclair
 Spiritwood
 Stirton
 Streeter
 Strong
 Sydney
 Valley Spring
 Wadsworth
 Walters
 Weld
 Windsor
 Winfield
 Woodbury
 Ypsilanti

Politics
Stutsman County voters have been reliably Republican for several decades. In no national election since 1964 has the county selected the Democratic Party candidate.

See also
 National Register of Historic Places listings in Stutsman County, North Dakota
 North Dakota statistical areas

References

External links
 Stutsman County official website
 Stutsman County in the world war : Jamestown, North Dakota (1919) from the Digital Horizons website
 Stutsman County North Dakota in the James River Valley : a Stutsman home, and herds on pasture (1925) from the Digital Horizons website
 Stutsman County maps, Sheet 1 (northern) and Sheet 2 (southern), North Dakota DOT

 
1873 establishments in Dakota Territory
Populated places established in 1873